The Monismanien Prize (Monismanienpriset) is awarded by Göteborgs nation at Uppsala University. The prize is awarded to organizations and individuals who have made great efforts to defend freedom of speech.

History
Monismanien Prize was founded in 1975  by Swedish filmmaker Kenne Fant (1923–2016) in memory of Torgny Segerstedt (1876-1945) who served as  editor-in-chief of the newspaper Göteborgs Handels- och Sjöfartstidning. 
Kenne Fant received an award of SEK 124,000  from the Swedish Film Institute for his film Monismanien 1995 (1975) which takes place in a futuristic society with a dictatorship and no freedom of speech. He set aside this money as a basis for the Monismanien Foundation, which administers the prize. Today the foundation has grown significantly and the price is therefor considerably larger. The next Monismanien prize recipient will be announced fall 2022.

Notable past recipients 
 Alva Myrdal - 1976  
 Simone Veil- 1977  
 Lech Wałęsa- 1981
 Günter Wallraff - 1984 
 André Brink- 1989 
 Andre Brink - 1992 
 Taslima Nasrin - 1995
 Yasar Kemal- 1997  
 Desmond Tutu - 1999  
 John Pilger   - 2001
 Emily Lau- 2003  
 Václav Havel - 2005  
Margot Wallström- 2009  
 Herta Müller -2011  
 Raif Badawi - 2017
 Ulla Carlsson - 2019
 No recipient due to a pandemic - 2021
 Eliot Higgins - Bellingcat - 2022

References

External links
Göteborgs Nation website
Swedish awards
Awards established in 1975

Chairman of the Monismanien board 

onismanienrepresentanten är i dag ordförande för Kenne Fants Stiftelse. Hens uppdrag är att leda arbetet för det fria ordet, utbilda nationens medlemmar om priset samt föreslå pristagare och arrangera en prisceremoni värdig denne pristagare. Monismanienrepresentanten väljs av Göteborgs Nations landskap. Numera är mandatperioden två år och därför delas oftast priset ut varannat år om inga extraordinära omständigheter inträffar.

 1974->1975 - Torgny Segerstedt d.y. ordförande för stiftelsen och nationens Förste Kurator.
 1975->1979 - Not confirmed
 1979->1980 - Björn Jidéus
 1981->1984 - Not confirmed
 1984->1987 - Martin H:son Holmdal ordförande för stiftelsen och nationens inspektor.
 1987->1989 - Jörgen Frotzler
 1989->1993 - Åsa ***
 1993->1995 - Pernilla Ewerby
 1996->1998 - Annika Lund
 1998 - 2000 - Olof Wilske
 2000->2002 - Ola Vedin
 2002->2004 - Anna Vogel
 2004->2006 Johan Andersson
 2008->2010 Ida Gustafsson
 2010->2011 Beatrice Nybert
 2011->2014 Sara Lilltheir
 2014->2018 - Mimmi Lundin
 2018->2020 - Elin Bergman
 2020->2021 - Elias Collin (No recipient due to a pandemic)
 2021->Today - Evelina Reuterfors